Touching from a Distance is a biography written by Deborah Curtis.  It details her life and marriage with Ian Curtis, lead singer of the 1970s British post-punk band Joy Division.  In the book, Deborah Curtis speaks of Ian's infidelity, their troubled marriage, Ian's volatile and sometimes troubled personality, and his health problems (which included epileptic seizures and depression) that likely led to his suicide in 1980, on the eve of Joy Division's first United States tour. The foreword was written by the music journalist Jon Savage.

The title is a reference to a line in one of Joy Division's most popular songs, "Transmission". The appendix contains four sections: Discography, Lyrics, Unseen Lyrics, and Gig List. The Unseen Lyrics section contains songs that either were not recorded or finished.

Adaptation
The book has been used as a reference for the Anton Corbijn's film Control (2007), for which Deborah Curtis was a co-producer. The role of Deborah was played by Samantha Morton.

References

External links
 Excerpts on Google Books from 2014 edition. . .

Joy Division
Non-fiction books adapted into films
Faber and Faber books
Biographies about musicians
1995 non-fiction books